Valentine Records is a British independent record label, based in Manchester, England and founded in September 2001.

Its initial roster comprised guitar bands such as Extinguish Her, Chevron, Palo Alto and Five Years Later as well as electronic/laptop artists such as I-Node, doublejo(H)ngrey, Lynskey, Ultrafoetus and The Hi Fi Renaissance.

At present the roster comprises Mark Corrin (aka Shirokuma, formerly of Faith & Hope Records), John Callaghan (also of Warp Records/Uncharted Audio), Babyslave, I-Lucifer, Still Forever, Pandemonium, Dirty Mice, Gleick and Reigns of Monty Carlo.

International guest artists include Neil Milton (Warsaw), No-way Sweden (Melbourne), Red Martian (Seattle), Warscapes (Paris) and Daniel Maze (Vancouver).

Valentine has also promoted a variety of live events over the years, including showcases at Manchester's In The City and Futuresonic Festivals, alongside the clubnights To Amy With Love, Transmission: Manchester, Rebellious Jukebox, TAGO>MAGO and SOUND>VISION. In 2016, along with AnalogueTrash Records, the label hosted the two day FOUNDATIONS micro-festival, celebrating grassroots live music, creative collaboration, community networking and multimedia art/film and performance.

Featured live acts have included Cylob, Max Tundra, Capitol K, ¡Forward, Russia!, Damo Suzuki, Kylie Minoise and iLiKETRAiNS.

Discography

See also
 List of independent UK record labels

References

External links
Official website

British independent record labels